Spodnje Grušovlje is a small settlement in the Municipality of Žalec in east-central Slovenia. It lies in the lower Savinja Valley north of Šempeter v Savinjski Dolini. The area is part of the traditional region of Styria. The municipality is now included in the Savinja Statistical Region.

References

External links
Spodnje Grušovlje at Geopedia

Populated places in the Municipality of Žalec